A shipyard is a place where ships are built and repaired.

Shipyard or Ship Yard may also refer to:
 Ship Yard, a rail yard in Richmond, Virginia
 Shipyard, Belize, a village in the Orange Walk District of Belize
 Shipyard Brewing Company, an American microbrewery and soft drink manufacturer
 Shipyard Railway, a rail line in Richmond, California, in use during World War II
 Yard (sailing), a spar on the mast of a sailing ship

See also
 Ship (disambiguation)
 Yard (disambiguation)